Supergirl – Das Mädchen von den Sternen is (translation: "The Girl from the Stars") 1971 German TV film directed by Rudolf Thome and written by . It has no connection with the comic book character Supergirl. The music was written and played by Patrick Moraz.

Cast 
 Iris Berben - Supergirl/Francesca Farnese
 Marquard Bohm - Evers
 Nikolaus Dutsch - Charly Seibert
 Karin Thome - Elsa Morandi
 Jess Hahn - Polonsky
 Rainer Werner Fassbinder - Cameo appearance
 Affonso Beato - Mann vom anderen Stern
 Hans Weth - Barmann
 Monique Marshall - Mädchen an der Bar
 Carlos Bustamante - Polonsky's assistant
 Isolde Jovine - Jackie
  - American director
 Peter Moland - Detective Phil
 Billy Kearns - Himself
 Eddie Constantine - Party guest

External links 
 
 (de) http://www.deutsches-filmhaus.de/filme_einzeln/t_einzeln/thome_rudolf/supergirl.htm

1971 films
West German films
1970s German films